Hendrik Swalmius (1577 – 1649), was a Dutch theologian known today for his portrait by Frans Hals.

Biography
He was born in Rhoon as the son of Hendrick van de Swalme, or Henricus Swalmius, who was probably born in Flanders and spent time in England before becoming preacher in Rhoon in 1580.  It was in Rhoon that he changed his name from Swalme to Swalmius. Swalmius the Elder had 4 sons:
 Arnoldus, who became a preacher in Westmaas, 's Gravesande
 Hendrik the younger, this Hendrik who married Judith van Breda in 1600 and became preacher of Oud-Alblas and later of the Grote Kerk, Haarlem in 1625
 Carel (1587-1640) who became a dike-reeve in IJzendijke
 Eleazar (1582-1652), who became a preacher in Amsterdam and was portrayed by Rembrandt (or someone in his studio).

In 1650 an engraving based on the Hals portrait of Hendrick was made by Suyderhoef stating he was  a preacher in Rhoon.

After his wife died he remarried in Haarlem in 1640 to IJfje Willems van Weert. He died in Haarlem in 1649.

References

Hendrik Swalmius in biography of Eleazer, according to A.J. van der Aa

1577 births
1649 deaths
17th-century Dutch Calvinist and Reformed ministers
People from Albrandswaard
Frans Hals